Al Cohn's Tones (also released as The Progressive Al Cohn) is an album by saxophonist composer and arranger Al Cohn comprising two sessions, one recorded in 1950 and the other from 1953, which was released on the Savoy label in 1956.

Reception
The Allmusic review by Stephen Cook stated: "Backed by some of the top bop players of the day, Al Cohn stretches out here for a program heavy with up-tempo swingers. ...this early Cohn release is at once hot and cool, vigorous and lithe".

Track listing
All compositions by Al Cohn except where noted
 "I'm Tellin' Ya" - 5:58
 "Jane Street" - 4:37 	
 "Infinity" - 	2:57 	
 "How Long Has This Been Going On?" (George Gershwin, Ira Gershwin) - 3:13 	
 "That's What You Think" - 4:50 	
 "Ah Moore" - 4:57 	
 "Groovin' With Gus" - 2:36 	
 "Let's Get Away from It All" (Matt Dennis, Tom Adair) - 3:10

Personnel 
Al Cohn - tenor saxophone
Nick Travis - trumpet (tracks 01-02, 05-06)
Horace Silver (tracks 01-02, 05-06), George Wallington (tracks 03-04, 07-08) - piano
Tommy Potter (tracks 03-04, 07-08), Curly Russell (tracks 01-02, 05-06) - bass
Tiny Kahn (tracks 01-02, 05-06), Max Roach (tracks 03-04, 07-08) - drums

References 

1956 albums
Savoy Records albums
Al Cohn albums
Albums recorded at Van Gelder Studio